Hong Kong has a multi-party system, with numerous parties in which no one party was allowed to gain power by controlling the Legislative Council.  The Chief Executive is selected by the Politburo based on an indirectly elected Election Committee and is de facto pro-Beijing but de jure is said to be nonpartisan as specified in the Chief Executive Election Ordinance. Once selected, the Chief Executive forms an unelected government which superficially has to rely on political parties in the legislature for support, but the legislature has been deliberately designed and redesigned to be a pro-Beijing rubber stamp body.

Hong Kong has no legislation for political parties, and thus has no legal definition for what a political party is. Most political parties and political groups registered either as limited companies or societies.

In Hong Kong there were two main political ideological blocs, which presents to pro-democracy camp (include localists) and pro-Beijing camp. Under the newly introduced electoral system, only government-approved candidates may run, effectively disqualifying any candidates who are not from the pro-Beijing camp or approved by Beijing. Most of the pro-democracy camp Legislative Councillors from the previous LegCo have been jailed by the Hong Kong government and are therefore disqualified from participating in elections without the need for government vetting.

Present parties
The list includes also political groups, trade unions, professional associations and pressure groups in Hong Kong that have been active in elections but are not considered parties.

Parties and groups in the Legislative and District Councils 
As of 19 June 2017, there were a total number of 16 political groupings represented in the Legislative and District Councils: There are currently (As of August 2021) 8 political groups are still officially represented, and 4 further political groups represented by members of the first 8 groups (New Territories Association of Societies, New Territories Heung Yee Kuk, Kowloon West New Dynamic, Civil Force), all 12 are pro-Beijing parties.

Other parties and groups 
Other parties and groups without any representation that have participated in the elections include:

Pro-democracy camp 
 2047 Hong Kong Monitor
 7.1 People Pile
 April Fifth Action
 Chinese Labour Party
 Chinese Liberal Democratic Party
 China Youth Service & Recreation Centre
 Citizens' Radio
 Civic Act-Up (part of Labour Party)
 Civic Party
 Democratic Party
 The Frontier
 Hong Kong Association for Democracy and People's Livelihood
 HK First
 Hong Kong and Kowloon Trades Union Council
 Hong Kong Awakening Association
 Hong Kong Caritas Employees Union
 Hong Kong Chinese Medicine Practitioners' Rights General Union
 Hong Kong Democratic Development Network
 Hong Kong Democratic Foundation
 Hong Kong Independence Party
 Hong Kong Social Workers' General Union
 Labour Party
 Land Justice League
 League of Social Democrats
 Neighbourhood and Worker's Service Centre
 People Power
 Pioneer of Victoria Park
 Power Voters (part of People Power)
 Professional Commons 
 Revolutionary Communist Party of China (October Review)
 Socialist Action
 Southern Democratic Alliance
 Synergy Kowloon

Pro-Beijing camp 
 Bauhinia Party
 Business and Professionals Federation of Hong Kong
 Civil Force
 Economic Synergy (part of Business and Professionals Alliance for Hong Kong)
 Education Convergence
 Government Disciplined Services General Union
 Hong Kong Federation of Education Workers
 Hong Kong Chinese Reform Association
 Hong Kong Civic Association
 Hong Kong Medical Association
 Hong Kong Public Doctors' Association
 Hong Kong Women Teachers' Organization
 Justice Alliance
 New Youth Forum
 HK Round Table On People’s Livelihood
 Politihk Social Strategic
 Professional Forum (part of Business and Professionals Alliance for Hong Kong)
 Third Force
 Voice of Loving Hong Kong
 Path of Democracy
 Third Side

Localist groups 
 Christians to the World
 Conservative Party
 Empowering Hong Kong
 Hong Kong Indigenous
 Hong Kong Localism Power
 Hong Kong Resurgence Order
 Kowloon East Community
 Nationalist Hong Kong
 Proletariat Political Institute
 Tai Po Sunwalker
 Tin Shui Wai New Force
 Tsuen Wan Community Network
 Tuen Mun Community
 Tuen Mun Community Network
 Youngspiration

Umbrella organisations 
 Ching Fat Living Concern Group
 North of the Rings
 Tsuen Wan Dynamic for the People

Others 
 Alliance for Social and Economic Advancement
 Green Party of Hong Kong
 Hong Kong People's Livelihood Party
 New Prospect for Hong Kong
 MESSAGE

Regional organisations, communal pressure groups and Kaifong associations 
 Action 18
 Ap Lei Chau Community Trade Union
 Cheung Sha Wan West Front
 Choi Hung Estate Social Service Association
 Concern Group for Tseung Kwan O People's Livelihood
 Community Alliance
 Deliberation Tsuen Wan
 Fu Sun Generation
 Heung Yee Kuk
 Hong Kong Island Federation
 HTTH Environmental Concern Group
 Kowloon East Community
 Kowloon Federation of Associations
 Fu Cheong Hung Estate Residents' Association
 Kwun Tong Residents Association
 Hong Kong People's Council on Housing Policy
 Kowloon West New Dynamic
 New Territories Association of Societies
 New Territories West Residents Association
 Hong Kong Tin Shui Wai Women Association
 Luen Wo United
 Lung Mun Concern Group
 North District Blueprint
 North of the Rings
 Sai Kung Commons
 Sha Tin Community Network
 Sha Tin Community Vision
 Shau Kei Wan East Future
 Tai Po Democratic Alliance
 Tai Po Network of Democracy and Livelihood
 Tin Shui Wai Connection
 Tin Shui Wai Livelihood Progression Union
 Tseung Kwan O Pioneers
 Tseung Kwan O Shining
 Tsing Yi Concern Group
 Tsing Yi People
 Tsuen Wan Dynamic for the People
 Unity of San Hui

Electoral coalitions 
 7.1 United Front
 A16 Alliance
 ABC.P.A
 Academics In Support of Democracy
 Action 9
 Alliance of Housing Department Staff Unions
 ALLinHK
 Central and Western Democratic Power
 Civic Passion–Proletariat Political Institute–Hong Kong Resurgence Order
 Coalition of Hong Kong Newspaper and Magazine Merchant
 Democrat Professionals Hong Kong
 Democratic Accountants
 Democratic Coalition for DC Election
 Demo-Social 12/Demo-Social 60/Demo-Social Front
 Doctors for Democracy
 Engineers for Universal Suffrage
 Gov.ALPS
 Health Professionals for Democracy 30
 Hearts of Accountants
 ICT Energy
 IT Voice/IT Voice 2012/IT Vision
 O Superpower
 People Power–League of Social Democrats
 Progressive Social Work
 Students United 2017
 Tertiary 2012
 Together for Social Welfare
 User Voice
 V18 Accountants
 Vox Pop
 Welfare Empower Hong Kong
 Win Win Hong Kong Accountants
 Y5 Give Me Five
 Your Vote Counts

Defunct 

 123 Democratic Alliance
 Alliance for Universal Suffrage
 Association for Democracy and Justice
 Basic Law Article 45 Concern Group
 Cheung Sha Wan Community Establishment Power
 Citizens Party
 Civic Passion
 Co-operative Resources Centre
 Community March
 Community Sha Tin
 Constitutional Reform Association of Hong Kong
 Democratic Alliance
 Democratic Progressive Party of Hong Kong
 Democratic Self-Government Party of Hong Kong
 Demosistō
 Federation for the Stability of Hong Kong
 The Frontier
 Frontline Doctors' Union
 Hong Kong Affairs Society
 Hong Kong Alliance of Chinese and Expatriates
 Hong Kong Citizen Forum
 Hong Kong Confederation of Trade Unions
 Hong Kong Forum
 Hong Kong National Party
 Hong Kong Observers
 Hong Kong People's Association
 Hong Kong Policy Viewers
 Hong Kong Professional Teachers' Union
 Hong Kong Progressive Alliance
 Hong Kong Prospect Institute
 Hong Kong Socialist Democratic Party
 Kowloon City Observers
 Kowloon Residents' Association
 Liberal Democratic Federation of Hong Kong
 Liberal Democratic Party`
 Meeting Point
 Neo Democrats
 New Hong Kong Alliance
 New Hong Kong Society
 Power for Democracy 
 Progressive Hong Kong Society
 Public Affairs Society
 Reform Club of Hong Kong
 Social Democratic Forum
 Social Democratic Front
 Team Chu Hoi Dick of New Territories West
 Tsz Wan Shan Constructive Power
 Tuen Mun Community Network
 United Ants
 United Democrats of Hong Kong
 United Front for the Service of the People
 United Nations Association of Hong Kong
 Victoria Social Association

See also 
 Lists of political parties
 United Front in Hong Kong
 United Front Work Department
 United Front (China)
 List of political parties in the People's Republic of China
 List of political parties in the Republic of China
 List of political parties in Macau

References

Political parties
Hong Kong
 
Hong Kong